Tiendesitas ("a collection of little stores") is a shopping complex located along E. Rodriguez Jr. Avenue in, Ugong, Pasig.

Development
The complex began operations on September 26, 2005, and was developed by Ortigas & Company Limited Partnership (OCLP). Constructed at a cost of P200 million, Tiendesitas is a part of Ortigas East (former Frontera Verde), an interim 18.5 hectare Ortigas Center development project, much like the Greenhills Shopping Center.

The complex is surrounded by parking slots and is mainly served by jeepneys on C-5 and by buses which stop a short walk from the Tiendesitas gate.

Tiendesitas Villages
Tiendesitas is a complex of wide-opened "villages" featuring stylized Filipino architecture. The complex is made up of twelve pavilions inspired by Maranao architecture, which in turn traces its roots back to the bahay kubo. The roof of each pavilion is covered with chemically treated Cogon grass, and is equipped with sprinklers to avoid mishaps during fires. Duyans (hammocks) are scattered around the development to offer short breaks during shopping trips.  The Filipiniana inspiration extends to the comfort rooms: old kalesa wheels were transformed into chandelier frames to light up these restrooms.

More than 450 traders from Luzon, Visayas, and Mindanao specializing in merchandise from regions not usually found in mainstream retail outlets exhibit their wares in Tiendesitas' shopping pavilions. Haggling a la tiangge is a common negotiating tactic among local merchants.

Handicrafts Village

Philippine-made handicrafts (by members of Philippine Chamber of Handicrafts Industries) from home décor to fashion accessories are found at the Handicrafts Village. Benguet handicrafts are included in the limited edition merchandise to be found here.

Fashion Village
The Fashion Village showcases apparel and accessories from Philippine designers, notably Marikina.  Fashions sold in the Fashion Village include fabric woven in various regions of Mindanao, shell earrings from Cebu, and necklaces from other provinces in the South.

Personal Care and Novelties Village
Personal care and toiletries sold in the Personal Care and Novelties Village include homegrown, homemade organic soaps, lotions and aromatherapy lines developed by local traders. While these products normally surface only during bazaars, the Personal Care and Novelties Village allows them a year-round place to be exhibited and marketed to the public.

Pets Village
Licensed pet dealers in the Pets Village showcase exotic animals, rare species of birds, primates, snakes and iguanas. Domestic pets such as Labradors, Siamese cats, parrots and parakeets are also available. Pet grooming and care services are also available in the Pets Village.

Garden Village
A variety of potted plants, orchids, fruit-bearing trees and ornamentals can be seen at the Garden Village. Gi

Antiques Village
The Antiques Village hosts antique stores. The most expensive item in the store is an P800,000 – worth statue of Saint Augustine from Bohol. Other stalls sell carvings of the bulol, a granary god, with prices climbing to as high up as P40,000, while contemporary wood carvings from Cebu cost at least P350.

Furniture Village
Modern export-quality furniture is sold in the Furniture Village.

Food Village
The Food Village hosts 46 stalls selling local food specialties such as halo-halo, ihaw-ihaw, Minette's Inasal, Tita Lynn's flavored suman, Three Sisters’ Pasig pancit with chicharrón, budbod of Taytay (rice toppings), sisig, lechón, milkfish, and merienda specialties like bibingka, puto bungbong and kakanin. Products from the country's premier farms like Nenita's and Dizon's will also be made available here.

Delicacies
In the Delicacies Village, vendors sell small food offerings suitable for pasalubong include Vigan's empanada and longganisa, Tacloban's suman sa latik, chocolate suman, ube suman, langka suman and Cebu's famous danggit. Fresh fruits from the Davao Region like durian, mangosteen and mangoes among others to organic and fresh vegetables from Baguio and Benguet are also available.

Seafood sold in the Delicacies Village include special dried fish and pili from the Bicol Region, famous balut from Pateros, tuna from General Santos, crispy shrimps, cornick, and bagnet from Ilocos, taba ng talangka, biurong dalag, bottled smoked fish and oysters from Aklan and the well-loved boneless bangus from Dagupan.

Many varieties of rice to cook are sold here, from Nueva Ecija's Jasponica and Balatinao from Benguet.

Exhibits
An area in Tiendesitas is dedicated to special trade shows, exhibits, and unique Filipino cultural presentations that are scheduled year-round.  The Tiendesitas opening in September 2005 began with a week-long Bonsai exhibit at the People's Village and was followed in October by an antiques exhibit.

Calesa Rides
Shoppers can take calesa rides through the complex.  During the opening, there were only three calesas available. Since then, more calesas have been operating in the area.

Entertainment
Tiendesitas provides live entertainment daily starting at 8:30 PM. Live bands perform in the middle of Tiendesitas. On Sundays, along with the live band, the Bughaw Cultural Dance Group regularly performs, allowing visitors to witness traditional Filipino dances.

References

External links
New Shopping Destination Rises in Ortigas
Yuga's Photo Gallery
World of Cat Show at Tiendesitas
Eat your heart out at Tiendesitas
Fusing innovation and tradition
’Tis the year of the fashionista dog
SM Group , George Yang Grouplease land in Ortigas development

Retail markets in Metro Manila
Buildings and structures in Pasig
Ortigas Center